The SpaceX Starship is a fully reusable super heavy-lift launch vehicle under development by SpaceX.

The Starship launch vehicle is made up of the first-stage booster and the Starship second stage. The second stage functions as a self-contained spacecraft for carrying crew or cargo once in orbit. Both stages are powered by Raptor engines that burn liquid oxygen and liquid methane propellants in a highly efficient full-flow staged combustion power cycle. Both rocket stages are designed to be reused by landing vertically at the launch pad.

The spacecraft is planned to be refuelable in orbit before traveling to destinations that require more change in velocity (delta-v budget), such as the Moon and Mars. Proposed applications for Starship include regular crewed and cargo launches, building the Starlink internet constellation, and performing suborbital point-to-point flights on Earth.

Background 

Plans to create a heavy-lift launch vehicle at SpaceX date back to 2005. The methane–oxygen engines were in development by 2012 and the plan was announced publicly for the first time in 2016. The development program for Starship follows an iterative and incremental approach, involving frequent prototype construction, testing, and refinement, including low and high-altitude flight tests. , the date for the planned first orbital flight test has been announced for March 2023.

In November 2005, before SpaceX launched its first rocket, the Falcon 1, CEO Elon Musk first mentioned a heavy-lift rocket concept named BFR that could launch  to low Earth orbit. It would use the proposed Merlin 2 kerosene–oxygen rocket engine.

In July 2010, after the final launch of Falcon 1 a year prior,  Around 2015, Musk teased about the Mars Colonial Transporter, a proposed rocket for Mars colonization, powered by the methane–oxygen Raptor engines then in development.

On 26 September 2016, the Raptor engine was fired for the first time. Musk announced a proposed Interplanetary Transport System launch vehicle using the Raptor engines, with the two stages' tanks made from carbon composite for storing liquid methane and liquid oxygen. Despite the rocket's  launch capacity to low Earth orbit, Musk said, its launch price could be reduced because of its reusability. The spacecraft would come in three variants: crew, cargo, and propellant tanker for in-orbit refueling. The Interplanetary Transport System concept was criticized for requiring an unreasonable amount of development and public funds.

In September 2017, at the 68th International Astronautical Congress, Elon Musk presented a revision to the Interplanetary Transport System, called the Big Falcon Rocket (BFR). Variants of the BFR could send satellites to orbit, resupply the International Space Station, land on the Moon, travel between spaceports on Earth, and send humans to Mars. In April 2018, the mayor of Los Angeles confirmed plans for a BFR rocket production facility at the Port of Los Angeles, but the plan was abandoned around May 2020.

In September 2018, the BFR's spacecraft received two new forward flaps at the top and three larger aft flaps at the bottom. Both sets of flaps help to control the spacecraft's descent, and the aft flaps would function as landing legs for the final touchdown. The first contract for the BFR spacecraft was also announced: the DearMoon project, funded by billionaire Yusaku Maezawa, would fly Maezawa and six to eight artists in a free-return trajectory around the Moon. This contract secured crucial funding for the rocket's development. Two months later, the rocket booster and spacecraft were respectively named Super Heavy and Starship.

Development 

Starship's development is iterative and incremental, using tests on a series of rocket prototypes. The first prototype, Starhopper, performed several static fires and low-altitude flights. Seven of Starship's upper stage prototypes were flight tested between August 2020 and May 2021. A full-scale orbital test flight of the rocket is expected to take place in 2023.

Starship prototype tests can generally be classified into three main types. In proof pressure tests, the vehicle's tanks are pressurized with either gases or liquids to test their strength—sometimes deliberately until they burst. The vehicle then performs mission rehearsals, with or without propellant, to check the vehicle and ground infrastructure. Before a test flight, SpaceX loads the vehicle prototype with propellant and briefly fires its engines in a static fire test. Alternatively, the engines' turbopump spinning can be tested without firing the engines, referred to as a spin prime test.

After successful testing, uncrewed flight tests and launches may commence. During a suborbital launch, Starship prototypes fly to a high altitude and descend, landing either near the launch site, sea, or offshore platforms. During an orbital launch, Starship performs procedures as described in its mission profile. Starship rocket tests, flights, and launches have received significant media coverage.

Low-altitude flights 

The "Starhopper" was the first prototype to fly using a Raptor engine. The vehicle had three non-retractable legs and was shorter than the final spacecraft design. By August 2021, the vehicle had been retired and repurposed as a mounting point for communication, weather monitoring equipment, and a water tank.

In September 2019, Musk further detailed the lower-stage booster, the upper stage's method of controlling its descent, its heat shield, orbital refueling capacity, and potential destinations besides Mars. The aft flaps on the spacecraft were reduced from three to two, and Starship's body material was changed from carbon composites to stainless steel for its lower cost, higher melting point, strength at cryogenic temperatures, and ease of manufacture.

SpaceX was already constructing the first full-size Starship Mk1 and Mk2 upper-stage prototypes, at the SpaceX facilities in Boca Chica, Texas and Cocoa, Florida respectively. Neither prototype flew: Mk1 was destroyed in November 2019 during a pressure stress test and Mk2's Florida facility was abandoned and deconstructed throughout 2020. After the Mk prototypes, SpaceX began naming its new Starship upper-stage prototypes with the prefix "SN", short for "serial number". No prototypes between SN1 and SN4 flew either—SN1 and SN3 collapsed during pressure stress tests, and SN4 exploded after its fifth engine firing.

In June 2020, SpaceX started construction of a launch pad for orbit-capable Starship rockets. In the next month, the company bought two drilling rigs for $3.5 million each from Valaris plc during the latter's bankruptcy proceedings, to repurpose them as offshore spaceports. The first flight-capable Starship SN5 was cylindrical as it had no flaps or nose cone: just one Raptor engine, propellant tanks, and a mass simulator. On 3 September 2020, the similar-looking Starship SN6 repeated the hop; later that month, the Raptor Vacuum engine was fired in full duration.

High-altitude flights 

SN8 was the first fully complete Starship upper stage prototype. It underwent four preliminary static fire tests between October and November 2020. After SN8 dove back to the ground, its engines were hampered by low methane header tank pressure during the landing attempt, which led to a hard impact with the landing pad. Because SpaceX had violated its launch license and ignored warnings of worsening shock wave damage, the Federal Aviation Administration investigated the incident for two months.

The prototype crashed upon landing because one of its engines did not properly ignite. A month later, on 3 March, Starship SN10 launched on the same flight path as SN8 and 9. The vehicle landed hard and crushed its landing legs, leaning to one side, and a fire was seen at the vehicle's base. It exploded less than ten minutes later, probably due to a propellant tank rupture. On 30 March, Starship SN11 flew into thick fog along the same flight path. The vehicle exploded during descent, possibly due to excess propellant in a Raptor's methane turbopump.

In March 2021, the company disclosed a public construction plan for two sub-orbital launch pads, two orbital launch pads, two landing pads, two test stands, and a large propellant tank farm. The company soon proposed developing the surrounding Boca Chica village into a company town named Starbase; locals raised concerns about SpaceX's authority, power, and potential threat for eviction through eminent domain. In early April, the orbital launch pad's fuel storage tanks began mounting. A few weeks later, on 16 April, NASA selected Starship Human Landing System (HLS) as the crewed lunar lander. Blue Origin, a bidding competitor to SpaceX, disputed the decision and began a legal case in August 2021, which was dismissed by the Court of Federal Claims three months later.

Starship prototypes SN12, SN13, and SN14 were scrapped before completion; SN15 was selected to fly instead. SN15 had better avionics, structure, and engines. On 5 May 2021, SN15 launched, completed the same maneuvers as older prototypes, and landed safely. Even though SN15, like SN10, had a small fire in the engine area after landing, it was extinguished, completing the first successful high-altitude test.

Development towards first orbital launch 

In July 2021, Super Heavy BN3 conducted its first full-duration static firing and lit three engines. Around this time, SpaceX changed their naming scheme from "SN" to "Ship" for Starship crafts, and from "BN" to "Booster" for Super Heavy boosters. A month later, using cranes, Ship 20 was stacked atop Booster 4 to form the full launch vehicle for the first time; Ship 20 was also the first craft to have a body-tall heat shield. In October 2021, the catching mechanical arms were installed onto the integration tower and the first tank farm's construction was completed. Two weeks later, NASA and SpaceX announced their plans to construct Kennedy Space Center's Launch Complex 49.

The Raptor 2 engine was spotted by the public at the start of 2022. In February 2022, after stacking Ship 20 on top of Booster 4 using mechanical arms, Elon Musk gave a presentation on Starship, Raptor engine and Florida spaceport development at Starbase.

In June 2022, the Federal Aviation Administration determined that Starbase did not need a full environmental impact assessment, but that SpaceX must address issues identified in the preliminary environmental assessment. In July, Booster 7 tested spinning the liquid oxygen turbopumps on all thirty-three Raptor engines, and an explosion occurred at the base of the vehicle, destroying a pressure pipe and causing minor damage to the launchpad. By the end of November, Ship 24 had performed 2- and full 6-engine static fires, while Booster 7 had performed static fires with 1, 3, 7, 11, 14 engines  and finally on 9th February 2023 a static fire with 31 engines at 50% throttle (33 was attempted but one engine was disabled pre-firing, and another engine aborted).

The company described the planned test flight orbital trajectory in a report to the Federal Communications Commission. The spaceflight is speculated to last ninety minutes.

Design 

While the current prototype versions of Starship are not reused, Starship is designed to be a fully reusable and orbital rocket, to reduce launch costs and maintenance between flights. Elon Musk says that there may be both expendable and reusable versions of Starship in the future.
The rocket will consist of a Super Heavy first stage or a booster and a Starship second stage or spacecraft, powered by Raptor and Raptor Vacuum engines. The bodies of both rocket stages are made from stainless steel, giving Starship its strength for atmospheric entry. The rocket's reusability and stainless-steel construction has influenced rockets such as the Terran R and Project Jarvis.

According to Eric Berger of Ars Technica, the manufacturing process starts with rolls of steel. Seventeen of these cylinders and nose cones are stacked and welded along their edges to form the outer layer of the rocket, and the robot-made domes separate the methane and oxygen tanks.

Raptor engine 

Raptor is a family of rocket engines developed by SpaceX exclusively for use in Starship and Super Heavy. It burns liquid oxygen and methane in a highly efficient full-flow staged combustion power cycle. The Raptor engine uses methane as the fuel of choice over other rocket propellants, because methane produces less soot and can be directly synthesized from carbon dioxide and water.

The engine structure itself is mostly aluminum, copper and steel; oxidizer-side turbopumps and manifolds subject to corrosive oxygen-rich flames are made of an Inconel-like SX500 superalloy. Raptor's main combustion chamber can contain  of pressure, the highest of all rocket engines. A few parts are 3D printed. The Raptor's gimbaling range is 15°, higher than the RS-25's 12.5° and the Merlin's 5°. In mass production, SpaceX aims to produce each engine at a unit cost of US$250,000.

Operation at the stoichiometric ratio provides better performance in theory, but in practice usually results in overheating and destruction of the engine. The propellants leave the pre-burners and are injected into the main combustion chamber as hot gases instead of liquid droplets. The methane and oxygen are at such high temperatures and pressures that they ignite on contact, eliminating the need for igniters in the main combustion chamber.

At sea level, the standard Raptor engine produces  at a specific impulse of 327 seconds, increasing to 350 seconds in vacuum. Raptor Vacuum, used exclusively on the Starship upper stage, is modified with a regeneratively cooled nozzle extension made of brazed steel tubes, increasing its expansion ratio to about 90 and its specific impulse in vacuum to 380 seconds. Another engine variant, Raptor Boost, is exclusive to the Super Heavy booster; the engine variant lacks thrust vectoring and has limited throttle capability, in exchange for increased thrust.

Super Heavy booster 

The Super Heavy is a first stage or booster stage, and forms the lower part of the rocket. The engines are arranged in concentric rings, three in the innermost ring, ten in the middle ring, and twenty in the outermost ring. The two inner rings are filled with conventional Raptor engines with gimbal actuators for thrust vectoring, and the outermost ring is filled with Raptor Boost engines without gimbal actuators, to save mass. According to SpaceX, the engines collectively produce  at full power.

Super Heavy uses  of hydraulic fluid.

The grid fins are unevenly spaced for more pitch control and can only rotate in the roll axis. Between the grid fins are Super Heavy's hardpoints, used for lifting and catching by the mechanical arms on the integration tower. The booster's orientation can be controlled using cold gas thrusters fed with evaporated propellant inside the tanks. The booster's separation from the spacecraft is done by the Raptor engines and releasing the latches.

Starship spacecraft 

Starship is a second stage or long-duration spacecraft, and forms the upper part of the rocket. By refueling the Starship spacecraft in orbit using tanker spacecraft, Starship may be able to transport larger payloads and more astronauts to other Earth orbits, the Moon, and Mars.

The header tanks are better insulated due to their position and are reserved for use to flip and land the spacecraft following reentry. About  of hydraulic fluid is used for the spacecraft's operations. At the aft end of the Starship spacecraft are six Raptor engines, three of which are designed to operate in lower atmosphere, and three Raptor Vacuum engines designed for vacuum. A set of reaction control thrusters, mounted on the exterior, control attitude while in space.

The spacecraft has four body flaps to control the spacecraft's orientation and help dissipate energy during atmospheric entry, composed of two forward flaps and two aft flaps. Under the forward flaps, hardpoints are used for lifting and catching the spacecraft via mechanical arms. The flap's hinges are sealed with metal because they would be easily damaged during reentry.

Starship's heat shield, composed of thousands of hexagonal black tiles, is designed to be used many times without maintenance between flights. The tiles are made of silica They are attached with pins rather than glued, with small gaps in between to counteract heat expansion.

Variants 
For satellite launch, Starship will have a large cargo door which will open to release payloads and close upon reentry, instead of a more conventional jettisonable nose-cone fairing. Instead of a cleanroom, payloads are integrated directly into Starship's payload bay, which requires purging the payload bay with temperature-controlled ISO class 8 clean air. To deploy Starlink satellites, the cargo door will be replaced with a slot and dispenser rack, whose mechanism has been compared to a Pez candy dispenser.

Crewed Starship vehicles would replace the cargo bay with a pressurized crew section and would have a life support system. For long-duration missions, such as crewed flights to Mars, SpaceX describes the interior as potentially including "private cabins, large communal areas, centralized storage, solar storm shelters, and a viewing gallery". Starship's life support system is expected to recycle resources such as air and water from waste.

Starship Human Landing System (Starship HLS) is a crewed lunar lander variant of the Starship vehicle that is extensively modified for landing, operation, and takeoff from the lunar surface. It features modified landing legs, a body-mounted solar array, a set of thrusters mounted mid-body to assist with final landing and takeoff, two airlocks, and an elevator to lower crew and cargo onto the lunar surface.

To reach higher-energy targets—such as geosynchronous orbit, the Moon, and Mars—Starship may be refueled by docking with separately launched Starship propellant tanker spacecraft. A Starship propellant depot could cache methane and oxygen on-orbit, and will be used by Starship HLS.

Mission profile 

The payload will integrate onto Starship at a separate facility and then roll out to the spaceport. After Super Heavy and Starship are stacked onto a launch mount by lifting from hardpoints, they will be loaded with propellant via the quick disconnect arm and mount. Roughly four hundred truck deliveries are needed for one launch, although some commodities will be provided on-site via an air separation unit. Then, the arm and mount will detach, all thirty-three engines of Super Heavy will fire, and the rocket will lift off.

The booster will then flip its orientation and ignite its engines briefly. As the booster returns to the launch site via a controlled descent.  it will be caught by a pair of mechanical arms.

Meanwhile, the Starship spacecraft accelerates to orbital velocity. Once in orbit, the spacecraft can be refueled by one or more tanker variant Starships, increasing the spacecraft's capacity. To land on bodies without an atmosphere, such as the Moon, Starship would turn on its engines and thrusters to slow down. To land on bodies with an atmosphere such as Earth and Mars, Starship will first slow down by entering the atmosphere via a heat shield. The spacecraft will then perform the "belly-flop" maneuver, by diving back through the atmosphere body first in a 60° angle to the ground, and control its fall using the four flaps.

Soon before landing, the Raptor engines will fire, using propellant from the header tanks, causing the spacecraft to resume a vertical orientation. At this stage, Raptor engines' gimbaling, throttle, and reaction control system's firing will help precisely maneuver the craft. A pseudospectral optimal control algorithm by the German Aerospace Center predicted that the landing flip would tilt up to 20° from the ground's perpendicular line, and the angle would be reduced to zero on touchdown. Future Starships are envisioned to be caught by mechanical arms, like the booster.

If Starship's rocket stages land on a pad, a mobile hydraulic lift will then move them to a transporter vehicle. If the rocket stages land on a floating platform, they will be transported by a barge to a port and finally transported by road. The recovered Super Heavy and Starship will either be positioned on the launch mount for another launch, or refurbished at a SpaceX facility.

SpaceX aims to refly the Super Heavy every hour; the Starship itself would have a minimum reflight time of 8 hours.

Potential uses 

Starship's reusability is expected to reduce launch costs, expanding space access to more payloads and entities. Musk has stated that a Starship orbital launch will eventually cost $1 million (or $10 per kilogram). Eurospace's director of research Pierre Lionnet, however, stated that Starship's launch price will likely be higher because of the rocket's development cost.

Commercial and defense 
Starship is also planned to launch the second satellite generation of SpaceX's Starlink, which delivers global high-speed internet. A space analyst at financial services company Morgan Stanley stated development of Starship and Starlink are intertwined, with Starship launch capacity enabling cheaper Starlink launches, and Starlink's profits financing Starship's development costs. 

As of 19 August 2022, the Superbird-9 communication satellite is Starship's first and only known contract for externally made commercial satellites. The satellite weighs  dry mass is planned to launch in 2024 to a geostationary orbit. In the near future, the spacecraft's crewed variant could be used for space tourism—for example, the DearMoon project funded by Yusaku Maezawa. Another example is the third flight of the Polaris program announced by Jared Isaacman.

Farther in the future, Starship may host point-to-point flights (called "Earth to Earth" flights by SpaceX), traveling anywhere on Earth in under an hour. SpaceX president and chief operating officer Gwynne Shotwell said point-to-point travel could become cost competitive with conventional business class flights. John Logsdon, an academic on space policy and history, said point-to-point travel is unrealistic, as the craft would switch between weightlessness to 5 g of acceleration. As of January 2022, SpaceX was awarded a $102 million dollar five-year contract to develop under the Rocket Cargo program.

Space exploration 

Starship's capability may enable large space telescopes such as the Large Ultraviolet Optical Infrared Surveyor, which detects Earth-like exoplanets. Starship might also launch probes orbiting Neptune or Io, or large sample-return missions, potentially giving insight into past volcanism on the Moon and possible extraterrestrial life. The low launch cost may also allow probes to use more-common and cheaper materials, such as glass instead of beryllium for large telescope mirrors.

There are differing opinions about how Starship's low launch cost will affect the cost of space science. According to Waleed Abdalati, former NASA Chief Scientist, the low launch cost will cheapen satellite replacement and enable more ambitious missions for budget-limited programs. According to Lionnet, low launch cost may not reduce the overall cost of a science mission significantly: Of the Rosetta space probe and Philae lander's mission cost of $1.7 billion, the cost of launch only made up ten percent.

Starship's lunar lander variant, Starship HLS, is critical to the Artemis program, a current NASA human exploration program of the Moon. The lander is accompanied by Starship tankers and Starship propellant depot variants. The tankers transfer propellant to a depot until it is full, then the depot fuels Starship HLS. The lunar lander is thus endowed with enough thrust to achieve a lunar orbit. Then, the crews onboard the Orion spacecraft are launched with the Space Launch System. Orion then docks with Starship HLS and the crews transfer into the lander. After landing and returning, the lunar crews transfer back to Orion and return to Earth.

Space colonization 
The Starship spacecraft's Mars variant is expected to be able to land on Mars and return to Earth. First, the main spacecraft is launched to low Earth orbit, then is refueled by around five tanker spacecraft before heading towards Mars. After landing on Mars, the Sabatier reaction is used to create liquid methane and liquid oxygen, Starship's propellant, in a power-to-gas plant. The plant's raw resources are taken from the Martian water and carbon dioxide. On Earth, similar technologies could be used to create carbon-neutral propellant for the rocket. Musk has made various tentative estimates of Starship's first crewed Mars landing; in March 2022, he gave a date of 2029.

SpaceX and Musk have stated their goal of colonizing Mars to ensure the long-term survival of humanity, with an ambition of sending a thousand Starship spacecraft to Mars during a Mars launch window. Musk had in 2001 joined the Mars Society and researched Mars-related space experiments. In 2011, SpaceX proposed robotic scientific missions to Mars using the Red Dragon capsule, adapted from its Dragon capsule, but the proposal was eventually abandoned around 2017. Some are skeptical of the date, because SpaceX has not detailed technical plans about Starship's life support systems, radiation protection, and in-orbit refueling.

Facilities

Testing and manufacturing 

Starbase consists of a manufacturing facility and launch site, and is located at Boca Chica, Texas. Both facilities operate twenty-four hours a day. and a maximum of 450 full-time employees may be onsite. The site is planned to consist of two launch sites, one payload processing facility, one seven-acre solar farm, and other facilities. , the expansion plan's permit has been withdrawn by the United States Army Corps of Engineers, citing lack of information provided. The company leases Starbase's land for the STARGATE research facility, owned by the University of Texas Rio Grande Valley, and uses part of it for Starship development.

At McGregor, Texas, the Rocket Development facility tests all Raptor engines. The facility has two main test stands: one horizontal stand for both engine types and one vertical stand for sea level–optimized rocket engines. Other test stands are used for checking Starship's reaction control thrusters and Falcon's Merlin engines. The McGregor facility previously hosted test flights of landable first stages—Grasshopper and F9R Dev1.

At Florida, a facility at Cocoa purifies silica for Starship heat-shield tiles, producing a slurry that is then shipped to a facility at Cape Canaveral. In the past, workers there constructed the Starship Mk2 prototype in competition with Starbase's crews. The Kennedy Space Center, also in Florida, is planned to host other Starship facilities, such as Starship launch sites at Launch Complex 39A, the planned Launch Complex 49, and a production facility at Roberts Road. The production facility is being expanded from Hangar X—Falcon rocket boosters' storage and maintenance facility. Roberts Road facility will include a  building, loading dock, and a place for constructing integration tower sections.

Launch sites 

Starbase is planned to host two launch sites, named Pad A and B. A launch site at Starbase has large facilities, such as a tank farm, launch pad, and an integration tower. Smaller facilities are present at the launch site: Tanks surrounding the area contain methane, oxygen, nitrogen, helium, hydraulic fluid, etc.; subcoolers near the tank farm cool propellant using liquid nitrogen; and various pipes are installed at large facilities. Each tank farm consists of eight tanks, enough for one orbital launch. The launch pad has a water sound suppression system, twenty clamps that hold down the booster, and a quick disconnect mount that provides the rocket with liquid propellant and electricity.

The integration tower or launch tower consists of steel truss sections, a lightning rod on top, and a pair of mechanical arms that can lift, catch and recover the booster. The mechanical arms are attached onto a carriage and controlled by a pulley at the top of the tower. The pulley is linked to a winch and spool at the base of the tower, using a cable. Using the winch, the carriage and mechanical arms can move vertically, with support from bearings attached at the sides of the carriage. A linear hydraulic actuator is used to move the arms horizontally. Tracks are mounted on top of arms, which are used to position the booster or spacecraft precisely. The tower is mounted with a quick disconnect arm that can extend to and contract from the booster; its functions are similar to the quick disconnect mount.

Since 2021, the company is constructing a Starship launch pad in Cape Canaveral, Florida in Kennedy Space Center's Launch Complex 39A, which is currently used to launch Crew Dragon capsules to the International Space Station. SpaceX plans to make a separate pad at 39A's north, named Launch Complex 49. Because of Launch Complex 39A's Crew Dragon launches, the company is studying how to strengthen the pad against the possibility of a Starship explosion and proposed to retrofit Cape Canaveral Space Launch Complex 40 instead. The towers and mechanical arms at the Florida launch sites should be similar to one at Starbase, with improvements.

Phobos and Deimos are the names of two Starship offshore launch platforms, both in renovation as of March 2022. Before being purchased from Valaris plc in June 2020, they were nearly identical oil platforms named Valaris 8501 and Valaris 8500. In February 2022, Musk stated Phobos and Deimos are not yet SpaceX's focus, but that in the far future, most Starship launches would start from offshore platforms.

Reception 

Outside the space community, reception to Starship's development among nearby locales has been mixed, especially from cities close to the Starbase spaceport. Proponents of SpaceX's arrival said the company would provide money, education, and job opportunities to the country's poorest areas. Fewer than one-fifth of those twenty-five or older in the Rio Grande Valley have a bachelor's degree, in comparison to the national average of one-third. The local government has stated that the company boosted the local economy by hiring local residents and investing, aiding the three-tenths of the population who live in poverty.

Opponents say the company encourages Brownsville's gentrification, with an ever-increasing property valuation. Even though Starbase had been originally planned to launch Falcon rockets when the original environmental assessment was completed in 2014, the site in 2019 was subsequently used to develop Starship, ultimately requiring a revised environmental assessment. Some of the tests have ended in large explosions, causing major disruption to residents and wildlife reserves. The disruption to residents is compounded by SpaceX's frequent closures of the road to the beach for vehicle testing. Some residents have moved away or requested financial reparations from the company.

Notes

References

External links 

 
 Programmatic Environmental Assessment by the Federal Aviation Administration
 Starship of SpaceX on eoPortal directory, administered by the European Space Agency
 Tim Dodd's Starship interviews with Elon Musk on YouTube:
 A conversation with Elon Musk about Starship, 2019
 Starbase and Starship tour, 2021: part 1, part 2, and part 3
 Launch tower and Raptor engine tour, 2022: overview, launch infrastructure, Raptor engine

Articles containing video clips
Cargo spacecraft
Crewed spacecraft
SpaceX launch vehicles
SpaceX spacecraft
 
VTVL rockets
Proposed reusable launch systems
Reusable spaceflight technology
Reusable spacecraft
Reusable launch systems